Nasir Jalil (born 13 April 1978) is a Pakistani first-class cricketer who played for Abbottabad cricket team. He is the brother of Pakistani women cricketer Qanita Jalil.

References

External links
 

1978 births
Living people
Pakistani cricketers
Abbottabad cricketers
Cricketers from Abbottabad